was a railway station on the Sanriku Railway Company’s Rias Line located in the city of Kamaishi, Iwate Prefecture, Japan. It is 27.7 rail kilometers from the terminus of the line at Sakari Station.

Station layout 
Tōni Station has a single elevated island platform. The station is unattended.

Platforms

History 
Tōni Station opened on 1 April 1984. During the 11 March 2011 Tōhoku earthquake and tsunami, part of the tracks on the Minami-Rias Line were swept away, thus suspending services. The line resumed operations on 3 April 2013 between Sakari and Yoshihama. Services between Yoshihama and Kamaishi resumed on 5 April 2014. Minami-Rias Line, a portion of Yamada Line, and Kita-Rias Line constitute Rias Line in 23 March 2019. Accordingly, this station became an intermediate station of Rias Line.

Adjacent stations

Surrounding area 
 Tōni Elementary School
 Tōni Middle School
 Tōni Post Office
Japan National Route 45
 List of railway stations in Japan

External links

References

Railway stations in Japan opened in 1984
Railway stations in Iwate Prefecture
Kamaishi, Iwate